Ven. Hugh Chambres Jones (1783 – 29 September 1869) was a Welsh churchman, Archdeacon of Essex from 1823 to 1861.

Jones was born in Liverpool to John Chambres Jones and educated at Christ Church, Oxford, where he matriculated in 1801, graduating B.A. in 1805. M.A. in 1807. He was Domestic Chaplain to the Duke of Portland. He held livings at West Ham and Aldham.

He retired to the family estate in Brynsteddfod or Bryn Eisteddfod, Glan Conwy, Wales. In 1816, he became Treasurer of St Paul's Cathedral, holding the post until his death.

References

|-

 

19th-century Welsh Anglican priests
Alumni of Christ Church, Oxford
Archdeacons of Essex
Clergy from Liverpool

1783 births
1869 deaths